Buddleja crotonoides is a shrub with a wide distribution, from California south to Nicaragua. The shrub grows at elevations of 2,000–2,500 m in oak woods and on scree in association with Arbutus xalapiensis, Pinus sp., and Crataegus mexicana. B. crotonoides was first named and described by Gray in 1847.

Description
Buddleja crotonoides makes a large shrub or small tree, < 5 m high, chiefly distinguished by its large leaves, < 20 cm in length, covered top and undersides with dense, soft hairs. The inflorescences are < 20 cm long, the flowers greenish-white or greenish-yellow. Ploidy: 2n = 76 (tetraploid).

Cultivation
Buddleja crotonoides is uncommon in the UK. Specimens are held as part of the NCCPG national collection at the Longstock Park Nursery, near Stockbridge. Although not hardy in the UK, the shrub can occasionally survive when given proper frost protection, preferably by being kept potted, and moved indoors at the onset of winter. Hardiness: USDA zone 9.

References

crotonoides
Flora of Belize
Flora of California
Flora of Costa Rica
Flora of Guatemala
Flora of Honduras
Flora of Mexico
Flora of Nicaragua
Flora of Central America
Flora without expected TNC conservation status